= International Committee for Standardization of Hematology =

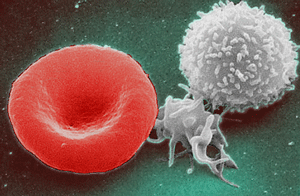
International Council for Standardization in Haematology

The International Council for Standardization of Hematology (ICSH) was originally known as the International Committee for Standardization in Hematology and was initiated by the European Society of Hematology (ESH) in 1963, as a standardization committee [1]. In 1964 it was formally ratified as an organization during a meeting of the International Society of Hematology (ISH), in Stockholm. The ICSH is a non-governmental organization recognized as having formal relations with the World Health Organization (WHO) and is a non-profit organization. The underlying goal of ICSH is to obtain reliable and repeatable results in the laboratory, mainly involving diagnostic haematology. All guidelines and recommendations now include the appropriate level of evidence. ICSH Working Groups review laboratory methods and tools for blood analysis, consider standardization issues, and promote and coordinate scientific work in the development of international standardized materials and guidelines.

== Sources ==
- McFadden S, Briggs C, Davis B, Jou J, Machin S. The reformed International Council for Standardization in Hematology (ICSH). Int Jnl Lab Hem 2008; 30: 89–90.
- Lewis SM. International Council for Standardization in Haematology – The first 40 years. Int Jnl Lab Hem 2009; 31: 253–67.
- Lee SH, Machin SJ. Years of the ICSH: 1964 to 2014. Int Jnl Lab Hem 2014; 36: 589–90.
- Lewis, S. M. (24 April 2009). "Standardization and harmonization of the blood count: The role of International Committee for Standardization in Haematology (ICSH)". European Journal of Haematology. 45 (S53): 9–13. doi:10.1111/j.1600-0609.1990.tb01520.x.
- Davis, Bruce H.; Jungerius, Bart (April 2010). "International Council for Standardization in Haematology technical report 1-2009: new reference material for haemiglobincyanide for use in standardization of blood haemoglobin measurements". International Journal of Laboratory Hematology. 32 (2): 139–141. doi:10.1111/j.1751-553x.2009.01196.x.
- Zini G, Kern W, Brereton M, Stephens AD. ICSH: on board for new projects. Int Jnl Lab Hem 2014; 36: 306–12
- Mackie I, Erber WN. The International Council for Standardization in Haematology: 1964–2021. Int Jnl Lab Hematol 2021; 43: 884–5.
